Mehboob Nausheer (born 24 December 1934) is an Indian former cricketer. He played nine first-class matches for Hyderabad between 1956 and 1959.

See also
 List of Hyderabad cricketers

References

External links
 

1934 births
Living people
Indian cricketers
Hyderabad cricketers
Cricketers from Hyderabad, India